Molecule Island is the easternmost of the Bragg Islands, lying in Crystal Sound  north of Cape Rey, Graham Land, Antarctica. It was mapped from surveys by the Falkland Islands Dependencies Survey in 1958–59. The name arose from association with Atom Rock in the same group.

See also 
 List of Antarctic and sub-Antarctic islands

References

Islands of Graham Land
Graham Coast